"Simpsorama" is the sixth episode of the twenty-sixth season of the animated television series The Simpsons, and the 558th episode of the series overall. It originally aired on the Fox network in the United States on November 9, 2014. This episode is a crossover with creator Matt Groening's other animated series Futurama that previously aired on Fox. The episode's title is a portmanteau of the titles of each series.

Plot

At Springfield Elementary School, Principal Skinner is showing Bart's class a time capsule intended to be opened a thousand years later and tells the students to each put something inside. Bart, having forgotten to bring something to put in it, puts a sandwich that he blows his nose into. At a ceremony, Mayor Quimby lowers the time capsule into the town square in front of the statue of Jebediah Springfield. When they dig up the hole, they notice some green ooze pouring out.

Later that night, the Simpsons hear a strange noise outside. Marge then hears something glugging and belching downstairs. Homer and Bart decide to go to the basement and investigate. Down in the basement, Bart sees a shadowy figure opening up a can of Duff Beer, who is revealed to be Bender, who says he is from the future. Homer and Bender become instant best friends. The next day, Lisa starts to doubt that Bender is actually from the future, since technology in the present is relatively advanced, so she takes him to Professor Frink's laboratory. Bender admits that he does not recall why he was sent to the present, so Frink unplugs and re-plugs Bender's mission protocol, causing Bender to reveal his mission is to terminate Homer; however, he cannot bring himself to do it. A hologram of Leela, Fry, and some rabbit-shaped creatures that are attacking New New York appears. When Lisa asks why Homer must be killed, Professor Farnsworth replies that the creatures have Homer's DNA and Bender was sent back to kill Homer before the creatures could evolve from him. Farnsworth, Leela and Fry go into the past to kill Homer themselves, but Bender protects Homer, preventing Leela from shooting him. Everyone goes back to the house except Farnsworth, Frink and Lisa, who remain at the lab to analyze a DNA sample.

When Farnsworth, Frink and Lisa get to the house, Farnsworth reveals that the DNA was only half of Homer's, with the other half belonging to Marge; they must kill one of their children instead now. Bender's rear shows a hologram of the creatures attacking Linda and Morbo, who report that the creatures have started evolving. One of the rabbits eats Linda and transforms into a lizard-like creature that resembles Bart, who then remembers that when he put his sandwich in the time capsule, it touched Milhouse's lucky rabbit's foot and the toxic ooze in the hole touched the items in the time capsule, mutating them into rabbit-like creatures with Bart's DNA. The Simpsons and the Planet Express crew arrive in the town square to dig up the capsule, but the time travel portal is damaged, sending everyone but Maggie and Bender to the year 3014.

At the Planet Express headquarters, Farnsworth proposes they shoot all the creatures into space in order to end the invasion. Lisa helps lure the creatures into Madison Cube Garden; the Planet Express Ship lifts the cube up and hurls it into space. Back in the present, Bender takes Maggie to the racetrack; since he has full records of every horse race ever run, he wins bet after bet and gives a portion of his winnings to Maggie.

The portal is successfully fixed and the Simpsons re-arrive in the present. Bender sets an internal alarm to wake him in 1,000 years and shuts down, and Homer puts him away in the basement and pours him one last beer, for which he is grateful.

The creatures are revealed to have landed on Omicron Persei 8, which is visited by Kang and Kodos, who reveal that they are a same-sex couple.

Production 
The episode was first announced in July 2013, two days after "The Simpsons Guy"—the hour-long crossover between Family Guy and The Simpsons—was announced. It was originally planned to air as either the season 25 finale or the season 26 premiere. It was ultimately slated for November 9, 2014. In an interview with Entertainment Weekly about the episode, Groening said, "That was a really tough one to negotiate, because I had to talk to myself." Al Jean added, "They were going off the air, so I thought people would really love it if we had one more chance to see those characters"; adding, "We're always looking for things that are compatible with us, and I thought, 'Well, what’s more compatible?' We do a joke, actually, about how similar Bender and Homer look. Like, they just erased Homer's hair." Jean also stated, "There's a thing in Futurama code where if you solve it, it says, 'Congratulations! You're a nerd.'"

The episode revealed that The Simpsons aliens Kang and Kodos are a lesbian couple. Al Jean told Entertainment Weekly: "People are asking: is this episode canon? And I go, 'What really happened—did Homer really fall off a cliff all those times and live?' But that being said: Yeah, sure, they're Kang and Kodos Johnson. They're a gay female couple in their species. They seemed to be married." In response to a sign in the episode showing Ralph Wiggum to have died in 2017, Jean said that it was in reference to the episode "Holidays of Future Passed" in which Ralph requires clones as his stupidity causes him to die in accidents. He declared that there would be no more deaths in the show, following the season premiere "Clown in the Dumps" in which Krusty the Clown's father died.

Reception
The episode received an audience of 6.70 million. It was the most-watched show on Fox that night.

The episode received mixed reviews from critics. Max Nicholson of IGN called the storyline "a bit dull especially considering some of Futuramas more epic storylines."

Zack Handlen and Dennis Perkins of The A.V. Club gave the episode a B−, stating, "There's no reason for this episode to exist, at least not in terms of storytelling. Seeing the Simpsons family interact with Bender, Fry, Leela, Professor Farnsworth, and the rest has a certain automatic thrill to it, like any half-assed Internet mash-up (that thing I like is in the same place as that other thing I like! THIS CHANGES EVERYTHING), but that thrill never deepens or enriches our understanding of these disparate groups."

Darren Franich of Entertainment Weekly stated, ".. .where 'The Simpsons Guy' fell down the meta-rabbit hole, 'Simpsorama' mostly settled for simple gags, with a hit ratio that was better than Futurama season 6 but not quite up to the standards of Futurama season 4."

Screen Rant called it the best episode of the 26th season.

References

External links
 
 

2014 American television episodes
Crossover animation
Crossover television
Futurama
The Simpsons (season 26) episodes
Television episodes about time travel
Television episodes about robots
Fiction set in the 31st century
Television crossover episodes